Aashayein is a 2010 Indian Hindi-language drama film written and directed by Nagesh Kukunoor, and produced by Percept Picture Company and T-Series. It stars John Abraham and Sonal Sehgal. The film revolves around Rahul, a gambler whose life changes one day when he is diagnosed with cancer but is given the hope of living his life to the fullest by several patients he meets at a rehabilitation center. The film released theatrically on 27 August 2010.

Plot
Rahul Sharma (John Abraham) is a compulsive gambler and, while betting, wins 30 million rupees. That night he asks his girlfriend, Nafisa (Sonal Sehgal), to marry him and she agrees. Right after this, Rahul collapses.

The next day he goes to the doctor for a medical test and finds out that he has cancer. Rahul does not know how to handle this situation, in the middle of the night runs down a street screaming, knowing that he only has months to live. On that night, he finds a piece of newspaper in which he sees an advertisement of a rehabilitation centre for persons with such incurable diseases to spend last days of their life in it. Rahul runs away from his fiancée, leaving most of the money he earned, for her.

Once Rahul gets into the centre, he meets several people like Parthasarthi (Girish Karnad) who speaks with the help of an electrolarynx because of his cancer; Madhu (Farida Jalal) who was a prostitute and an AIDS patient now; Padma (Anaitha Nair) a teenage girl with lot of dreams but no life to fulfill them – she can't even walk properly; Govinda (Ashwin Chitale) a comic loving kid, who is said to have certain higher capabilities and everybody treats him as a messenger of God. The relationship between Rahul and each of these people grows with time.

One day Rahul coughs hard and struggles for breath, and he goes to Govinda's room and falls down there. Next day when Rahul wakes up, Govinda offers him mangoes and he tells him a story. The story was similar to the story of Rahul's dreams, in which he imagines himself as Indiana Jones. In the story he is on a mission to find his lost whip which is locked in a box in the palace of death. To find the key of that box, he needs to make free many souls who are in chains. Rahul imagines himself to be Indiana Jones, and Parthasarathy, Madhu etc. as the locked spirits, and Padma as a spirit who motivates Rahul to find the key.

Later, he realises that the key to open all the locks of spirits is his heart and his love. He then arranges a beach program with Padma during which he brings a band that sings about living in the present. Prominent actor Shreyas Talpade appears as the lead singer in this song. Rahul asks everybody to write down their one wish and put it in a pot. Then he and Padma exchanges their wishes. They form the Wish Fairy Club and fulfill everybody's wishes.

Rahul and Padma were about to be in a physical relationship, but Rahul resists. Padma gets angry and throws off her wig to Rahul; she is bald, due to her disease. Padma's condition gets worse and Rahul looks for her wish pot. He finds that her last wish is to make love with Rahul. Rahul agrees and kisses Padma, and she dies at the moment.

Rahul finds an Indiana Jones costume and a whip in the Wish Fairy Club closet, which he had wished for and given by Padma. Rahul's condition gets worse, and Nafisa re-enters the story. It is revealed that Padma had called Nafisa before her death and asked her to take care of Rahul. Meanwhile, Govinda tell the further story to Rahul and Rahul desperately begin to search for a Map which will lead him to a waterfall to cure his cancer. He then realises that the waterfall is near a resort in Himalayas which was once the biggest dream of Rahul.

The closing scene of the movie shows Rahul and Nafisa leaving the rehabilitation centre. They are going on a journey to that resort to drink water from that waterfall which will cure Rahul's cancer.

Cast
 John Abraham as Rahul Sharma – An angry and confused compulsive gambler. Wishes to live the life he has been dreaming of
 Sonal Sehgal as Nafisa – Doting, loving, loyal girlfriend. Wishes that love always wins.
 Anaitha Nair as Padma – She is impetuous, obnoxious, full of life. Wishes to experience love.
 Prateeksha Lonkar as Sister Grace – She will bend her principles for the greater good. Wishes to dedicate her life for the happiness of her inmates.
 Girish Karnad as Parthasarthi – Fun loving, "uncle" to everyone, stupidly stubborn on his principles. Wishes to be reunited with his family.
 Farida Jalal as Madhu – Intelligent, virtuous, loving. Wishes to just lead a normal life and not be ostracised.
 Ashwin Chitale as Govinda – Ten years old, loves comics, mangoes and tells stories. Wishes that everyone's life be just like a comic book. Ashwin Chitale is a child actor who starred in the Marathi film Shwaas.
 Vikram Inamdar as Xavier
 Sonali Sachdev as Doctor (at clinic)
 Sharad Wagh as Priest
 Shreyas Talpade as the lead singer of a band (special appearance).
 Vijay Raghavn (special appearance).

Production
Aashayein was shot on locations in Puducherry and Hyderabad, India. John Abraham had to lose 16 kilos for the film. The title is inspired by the song "Aashayein" from Nagesh Kukunoor directed film Iqbal.

Track list

This music is composed by Pritam, Salim–Sulaiman (Ab mujhko jeena) and Shiraz Uppal (Rabba). Three Songs lyrics are penned by Mir Ali Husain, but Other ones Irshad Kamil (Dilkash Dildar Duniya), Ashish Pandit. The music was released on 27 July.

Critical reception
IANS rated the film 3.5 out of 5 saying, "This is unarguably Kukunoor’s most sensitive and moving work since "Iqbal". It touches the heart". Rajeev Masand of IBN gave 1.5/5 and commented, "Aashayein is a difficult film to sit through (...) it is in fact a serious test of your patience." Noyon Jyoti Parasara of AOL rated the film 2 out of 5 and said, "...nothing comes through except disappointment.".

Accolades

References

External links

T-Series (company) films
2010 films
2010s Hindi-language films
2010 drama films
Indian drama films
Indian films about cancer
Films about death
Films shot in Puducherry
Films shot in Andhra Pradesh
Films featuring songs by Pritam
Films scored by Salim–Sulaiman
HIV/AIDS in Indian films
Films directed by Nagesh Kukunoor
Hindi-language drama films
Films about diseases